Tees Rowing Club is a rowing club based on the River Tees in Northeast England.  The club was founded in 1864.

The Roll of Honour at the club includes 2012 Olympic Gold medal winner Kat Copeland and 2016 Paralympic Gold medal winner Laurence Whiteley.

The club is currently based at the River Tees Watersports Centre in Stockton-on-Tees.

Honours

British champions

Henley Royal Regatta

Club colours
The blade colours are or were "white, with a light blue and maroon stripe"; kit: maroon with two light blue side stripes. The blade without white is a recent photography-based variant and likely post-dates 2020, due to a change of colours.

References

External links
 

Rowing clubs in England
Sports clubs established in 1864
Sport in Stockton-on-Tees